Gu Cheng (September 24, 1956 – October 8, 1993) was a famous Chinese modern poet, essayist and novelist. He was a prominent member of the "Misty Poets", a group of Chinese modernist poets.

Biography
Gu Cheng was born in Beijing on 24 September 1956. He was the son of a prominent party member and the army poet Gu Gong. At the age of twelve, his family was sent to rural Shandong because of the Cultural Revolution (as means of re-education) where they bred pigs.  There, he claimed to have learned poetry directly from nature.

In the late 1970s, Gu became associated with the journal Today (Jintian) which began a movement in poetry known as "menglong" 朦胧 meaning "hazy", "obscure".  He became an international celebrity and travelled around the world accompanied by his wife, Xie Ye.  The two settled in Rocky Bay, a small village on Waiheke Island, Auckland, New Zealand in 1987. Gu taught Chinese at the University of Auckland in the City of Auckland.

In October 1993, Gu Cheng attacked his wife with an axe before hanging himself. She died later on the way to a hospital. The story of his death was widely covered in the Chinese media.

"A Generation"
The two-line poem titled "A Generation" ("一代人") was perhaps Gu Cheng's most famous contribution to contemporary Chinese literature. It had been considered an accurate representation of the younger generation during the Chinese Cultural Revolution seeking knowledge and future.

(translated by Juan Yuchi)
The darkest night gave me dark-colored eyes
Yet with them I'm seeking light

黑夜给了我黑色的眼睛 
我却用它寻找光明

Legacy
Gu Cheng's life was dramatised in the 1998 film The Poet, which focussed on his recurrent depression and the murder of his wife.

References

Further reading
 Chinese Writers on Writing featuring Gu Cheng. Ed. Arthur Sze. (Trinity University Press, 2010).
 Sea of Dreams: Selected Writings of Gu Cheng translated and edited by Joseph Allen. (New Directions: 2005)
 Selected Poems by Gu Cheng edited by Seán Golden and Chu Chiyu.  (Renditions Paperbacks, 1990)
 Poemas oscuros: Antología de Gu Cheng, traducido del chino por Javier Martín Ríos; revisión al español de Sun Xintang. (China Intercontinental Press: 2014).

External links

Dead in Exile: The Life and Death of Gu Cheng and Xie Ye by Anne-Marie Brady.  A personal account and review of several books about Gu Cheng and Xie Ye's last days.
Gu Cheng's Fortress official website by a small group of people who studied Gu Cheng's work.
 Prólogo al libro Cuatro Poetas Suicidas Chinos (Cinosargo 2013- Trad. Wilfredo Carrizales)
 Crítica de Leonardo Sanhueza al libro Cuatro Poetas Suicidas Chinos (Cinosargo 2013)
 Crítica de Alberto Hernández al libro Cuatro Poetas Suicidas Chinos (Cinosargo 2013) en Letralia

1956 births
1993 suicides
Poets from Beijing
Suicides by hanging in New Zealand
Chinese emigrants to New Zealand
People from Waiheke Island
Misty poets
20th-century poets